Lieutenant-General Sir Robert William O'Callaghan  (October 1777 – 9 June 1840) was a British Army officer and politician.

Career
Born the son of Cornelius O'Callaghan, 1st Baron Lismore, O'Callaghan was commissioned into the 128th Regiment of Foot in 1794. He served in the Peninsular War and temporarily commanded a brigade within the 2nd Division between January and July 1813 and permanently commanded a brigade of the 2nd Division between February and April 1814. He went on to command the 13th Brigade in France in 1815, the 3rd Brigade between 1815 and 1817 and the 7th Brigade in 1818. He served with the Army of Occupation in France and then became Commander-in-Chief, Scotland in 1825 and Commander-in-Chief of the Madras Army in 1831 before retiring in 1836.

He sat in the Irish House of Commons as the Member of Parliament for Bandonbridge from 1798 to 1800.

He was also Colonel of the 97th Regiment of Foot and then of the 39th Regiment of Foot. He died unmarried in London.

References

|-

 

|-

|-

|-

1777 births
1840 deaths
Knights Grand Cross of the Order of the Bath
British Army generals
39th Regiment of Foot officers
Irish MPs 1798–1800
Robert
British Army personnel of the Napoleonic Wars
Members of the Parliament of Ireland (pre-1801) for County Cork constituencies
Younger sons of barons